Filisovo is a village in Rybinsky District, Yaroslavl Oblast, Russia. It is known as the birthplace of the Red Army general, Pavel Batov.

As of 1 January 2007, Filisovo had the permanent population of only 1 person. Current population number is unknown.

Footnotes 

Rural localities in Yaroslavl Oblast